Myrlaea orcella is a species of snout moth in the genus Myrlaea. It was described by Émile Louis Ragonot in 1887 and is known from Uzbekistan (including Marghilan and Namangan).

References

Moths described in 1887
Phycitini
Taxa named by Émile Louis Ragonot